Paulis is the former name of Isiro, the capital of Haut-Uele Province in the northeastern part of the Democratic Republic of the Congo.

Paulis may also refer to:
 Păuliș, commune in Arad County, Romania
 Păuliș, village in the commune Șoimuș in Hunedoara County, Transylvania, Romania
 Ilse Paulis (born 1993), Dutch rower

See also
 Paulus (disambiguation)
 Powlus, surname
 Pauli, given name and surname